Anolis favillarum is a species of lizard in the family Dactyloidae. The species is found in the Dominican Republic.

References

Anoles
Reptiles described in 1968
Endemic fauna of the Dominican Republic
Reptiles of the Dominican Republic
Taxa named by Albert Schwartz (zoologist)